Pete Graves has been a British television presenter working for British Sky Broadcasting.
 
He anchored live association football and rugby union matches on Sky Sports. He also co-presented on Sky Sports News and Sky News.

Radio
Graves eventually took over the position of head commentator on all Newcastle United matches working alongside Mick Martin. His first Premier League match was Newcastle's 0–0 draw away at Portsmouth F.C. in October 2005 - He was just 23 years old.

Graves moved to Real Radio (formerly Century Radio) in 2007. He worked as a sports reporter and continued to present live coverage of Newcastle United matches. His new co-commentator was Bobby Moncur. His first match on Real Radio was the 2–1 victory over Liverpool F.C. in February 2007.

Graves wrote, produced and hosted a special one-hour programme dedicated to the life of his hero Sir Bobby Robson to mark his 75th birthday. The programme received widespread recognition and was aired again following Sir Bobby's death in July 2009.

Television
In February 2009 Graves joined Sky Sports News as a reporter. However, from June 2009 he was used mainly as a Presenter.

Personal life
Pete is the younger brother of actor Rupert Graves.

References

Living people
British association football commentators
Sky Sports presenters and reporters
1982 births